William Salwey Kendall (born 18 December 1973 in Wimbledon) is an English former cricketer who played over 200 games (in first-class and List A matches combined) for Hampshire around the turn of the 21st century, having earlier appeared on a number of occasions for Oxford University.

Kendall's highest first-class score of 201 was achieved against Sussex in 1999 under somewhat unusual circumstances. Replying to Sussex's first innings of 375, Hampshire were bowled out for just 76 (Kendall 2) and asked to follow on. However, second time around Hampshire piled on the runs, eventually declaring at 570/6; Kendall's 201 had taken slightly more than eight hours. (The match itself finished drawn.)

Kendall was capped by Hampshire in 1999, and named Hampshire Cricket Society's Player of the Year in 2000.

References

External links
 
 Statistical summary from CricketArchive
 Hampshire Cricket Society newsletter, October 2006

1973 births
Living people
English cricketers
Hampshire cricketers
Oxford University cricketers
People educated at Bradfield College
Alumni of Keble College, Oxford
British Universities cricketers